Yetta is a given name. Notable people with the name include:

 Yetta Barsh Shachtman (1915–1996), American socialist politician
 Yetta Emanuel, South African lawn bowler
 Yetta Zwerling (1894–1982), Yiddish movie star 
Fictional
 Yetta Rosenberg, character from The Nanny